Ayla Aksu (born 15 July 1996) is a Turkish tennis player.

She represented Turkey from 2010 to 2012 before choosing to represent the United States in 2013, but switching back to Turkey in 2014.

Aksu has a career-high WTA singles ranking of 214, achieved on 18 September 2017, and a career-high doubles ranking of No. 199, set on 11 June 2018. She has won 11 singles titles and 14 doubles titles on the ITF Circuit.

Aksu made her WTA Tour main-draw debut at the 2015 İstanbul Cup, in the doubles event, partnering Melis Sezer.

ITF Circuit finals

Singles: 20 (11 titles, 9 runner–ups)

Doubles: 24 (14 titles, 10 runner–ups)

External links
 
 
 

American female tennis players
American people of Turkish descent
Turkish female tennis players
1996 births
Living people
Competitors at the 2018 Mediterranean Games
Mediterranean Games competitors for Turkey
21st-century American women